Kamissa Camara (born 27 April 1983) is a Malian political analyst and politician. She is the former chief of staff to the President of Malian Republic after she resigned from the position on September 24, 2020.

She served as the country's Minister of Foreign Affairs from September 9, 2018 to April 23, 2019, then Minister of the Digital Economy and Planning from May 5, 2019 to June 11, 2020.

Early life and education
Camara was born in Grenoble to Malian parents who had emigrated to France in the 1970s.

Camara has a BA in applied foreign languages from Paris Diderot University and an MA in international economics and development from Pierre Mendès-France University. She did an internship at the United Nations in Washington, D.C. in 2005 and spent a year in Concord, New Hampshire as an au pair. In 2007, she did an internship at the African Development Bank in Tunisia, before obtaining a Green card and moving to the United States, living there for eight years.

Career
From 2007, Camara worked at the International Foundation for Electoral Systems overseeing West Africa and was one of the observers for the 2013 Malian presidential election in Timbuktu. She moved to the National Endowment for Democracy in 2012, where she was promoted to vice director for Central and West Africa in 2016. She also worked for a time with US presidential candidate Hillary Clinton.

Camara was a member of the Center for African Studies at Harvard University until December 2017. She was also the Director for Sub-Saharan Africa at the NGO PartnersGlobal until June 2018. She has written opinion pieces and political analysis for various publications in English and French and has been a political commentator on English and French TV programs. She was the first Malian political scientist to appear on CNN.

Camara is the founder and co-chair of the Sahel Strategy Forum. In 2017, she wrote a letter to Mali's President Ibrahim Boubacar Keïta, asking him to withdraw his plans to change the constitution. In July 2018, he appointed her as his diplomatic advisor. She was appointed Minister for Foreign Affairs by Keita on 9 September 2018, the first woman and youngest person to hold the post, and one of eleven women in the thirty-two member cabinet. She has spoken about the issues of regional security and alleged human rights violations. As of December 2018, when she gave a speech to the United Nations General Assembly in Marrakech deploring the withdrawal of some countries from the Global Compact for Migration, she was the world's youngest Foreign minister.

Personal life
Camara is a citizen of France, the US and Mali, and is fluent in French, English and Bambara. She is married.

References

External links
 Official website (in French)
 

Living people
1983 births
Politicians from Grenoble
French people of Malian descent
Citizens of Mali through descent
Paris Diderot University alumni
Malian emigrants to the United States
Political commentators
Foreign Ministers of Mali
Women government ministers of Mali
Female foreign ministers
21st-century Malian women politicians
21st-century Malian politicians